Scopula ablativa is a moth of  family Geometridae. It was described by Paul Dognin in 1911. It is endemic to Argentina.

References

Endemic fauna of Argentina
Moths described in 1911
ablativa
Taxa named by Paul Dognin
Moths of South America